
Gmina Gozdowo is a rural gmina (administrative district) in Sierpc County, Masovian Voivodeship, in east-central Poland.

Villages
Gmina Gozdowo contains the villages and settlements of Antoniewo, Białuty, Bombalice, Bonisław, Bronoszewice, Cetlin, Czachorowo, Czachowo, Czarnominek, Dzięgielewo, Głuchowo, Gnaty, Golejewo, Gozdowo, Kolczyn, Kowalewo Podborne, Kowalewo-Boguszyce, Kowalewo-Skorupki, Kozice, Kuniewo, Kurówko, Kurowo, Lelice, Lisewo Duże, Lisewo Małe, Lisice-Folwark, Łysakowo, Miodusy, Ostrowy, Reczewo, Rękawczyn, Rempin, Rogienice, Rogieniczki, Rycharcice, Smorzewo, Stradzewo, Węgrzynowo, Zakrzewko and Zbójno.

Neighbouring gminas
Gmina Gozdowo is bordered by the gminas of Bielsk, Brudzeń Duży, Mochowo, Sierpc, Stara Biała and Zawidz.

References
Polish official population figures 2006

Gozdowo
Sierpc County